The following is a list of the 23 cantons of the Marne department, in France, following the French canton reorganisation which came into effect in March 2015:

 Argonne Suippe et Vesle
 Bourgogne-Fresne
 Châlons-en-Champagne-1
 Châlons-en-Champagne-2
 Châlons-en-Champagne-3
 Dormans-Paysages de Champagne
 Épernay-1
 Épernay-2
 Fismes-Montagne de Reims
 Mourmelon-Vesle et Monts de Champagne
 Reims-1
 Reims-2
 Reims-3
 Reims-4
 Reims-5
 Reims-6
 Reims-7
 Reims-8
 Reims-9
 Sermaize-les-Bains
 Sézanne-Brie et Champagne
 Vertus-Plaine Champenoise
 Vitry-le-François-Champagne et Der

References